"For the First Time" is a song by Irish pop rock band the Script. Written by band members Danny O'Donoghue and Mark Sheehan, the song was released on 20 August 2010 as the lead single from the band's second studio album Science & Faith.  It debuted at number one on the Irish Singles Chart, becoming the Script's first number-one single. The Wanted covered this song live on BBC Radio 1 Live Lounge and used that version in their EP Lose My Mind.

Background
Danny O'Donoghue told the story behind the song in an interview with Merrick, Dools & Ricki-Lee on Sydney radio station Nova 96.9. Said O'Donoghue: "The song 'For the First Time' was about a time when we got back after touring around the world. We wanted to press palms with the people who had really gotten us there, and we got home and realised there's a stark reality out there, the recession, people are losing their jobs and their valuable things, and we thought, it almost pales in comparison to your news. We started the song, and it ended up being a bit bleak and we felt we really needed a great message in these, to turn it around... so we needed a message of hope, as people are being stripped of all these things they're realizing what's really important. It's all about going back to basics: drinking cheap wine, eating your dinner off the floor. That's when you meet each other for the first time, when you have nothing."

The song was sampled by the band on the track "Good Ol' Days" from their third studio album 3 (2012). The song was also sampled by rapper Machine Gun Kelly, or MGK, for his track "Her Song" off of the "EST 4 Life" (2012) mixtape.

Music video

The music video features band members of the Script within a studio and clips of a couple who have emigrated from Ireland to New York City. The characters in the music video are played by Eve Hewson, daughter of U2's Bono, and Luke Treadaway. The video was inspired by O. Henry's short story The Gift of the Magi.

Chart performance
"For the First Time" debuted on the Irish Singles Chart at number one on 10 September 2010, knocking Katy Perry's "Teenage Dream" from the top spot. This marks the band's first number-one single and third top-ten hit in Ireland. On its second week on the chart, the single remained at the top spot. The single debuted at number five on the UK Singles Chart before moving up to number four the following week. In Australia, "For the First Time" debuted and peaked at number 12 on the Australian ARIA Singles Chart. It reached number four on the US Billboard Adult Top 40 chart and number 23 on the Billboard Hot 100. This is their third song that has hit both of these charts. The song was certified Gold in the U.S. by the RIAA, meaning the song has been downloaded 500,000 times. As of June 2011, the song was sold 1,000,000 times in the United States.

Track listing
 CD single
 "For The First Time" – 4:11
 "Breakeven" (Live at Shepherd's Bush Empire) – 4:30
 Digital download
 "For The First Time" – 4:11
 "For The First Time" (Music Video) – 4:41

Personnel
 Songwriting and production – Danny O'Donoghue, Mark Sheehan
 Additional production, additional keyboards and guitars – Andrew Frampton
 Drums, guitars, keyboards and vocals – the Script
 Bass – Ben Sargeant

Charts

Weekly charts

Year-end charts

Certifications

See also
 List of number-one singles of 2010 (Ireland)

References

2010s ballads
2010 songs
Songs written by Danny O'Donoghue
Songs written by Mark Sheehan
Phonogenic Records singles
Epic Records singles
2010 singles
The Script songs
Rock ballads
Irish Singles Chart number-one singles
Songs about alcohol